"Don't Bet Money Honey" is a song written and performed by Linda Scott. It reached #3 on the US adult contemporary chart, #9 on the Billboard Hot 100, and #50 on the UK Singles Chart in 1961.

The song was produced and arranged by Hutch Davie.

The single ranked #36 on Billboard's Year-End Hot 100 singles of 1961.

The B-side to the single, "Starlight, Starbright", reached #44 on the Billboard chart.

Other versions
Ray Ellis and His Orchestra released a version of the song on their 1961 album, Ray Ellis Plays the Top 20.

References

1961 songs
1961 singles
Linda Scott songs
Canadian-American Records singles